William Peere Williams may refer to:

 William Peere Williams (1664–1736), Member of Parliament for Bishops Castle (1722–1727)
 Sir William Williams, 2nd Baronet, of Clapton (1730–1761), Member of Parliament for New Shoreham (1758–1761)
 William Peere Williams-Freeman (1742–1832), Royal Navy officer and admiral of the fleet

See also
William Williams (disambiguation)